Nam Gwan-U (also transliterated Nam Kwan-Woo, born 23 October 1955) is a South Korean equestrian. He competed in two events at the 1988 Summer Olympics.

References

External links
 

1955 births
Living people
South Korean male equestrians
Olympic equestrians of South Korea
Equestrians at the 1988 Summer Olympics
Place of birth missing (living people)